Nemophora griseella is a moth of the Adelidae family or fairy longhorn moths. It was described by Lord Walsingham in 1880. It is found in India, Burma and Nepal.

References

Adelidae
Moths described in 1880
Moths of Asia